Maximilian Eggestein (born 8 December 1996) is a German professional footballer who plays as an midfielder for SC Freiburg. He is also the older brother of fellow professional footballer Johannes Eggestein.

Club career

Werder Bremen
Eggestein joined Werder Bremen in 2011 from TSV Havelse. He made his debut for Werder Bremen II on 1 August 2014 against Eintracht Braunschweig II.

On 29 November 2014, he made his first team debut in a Bundesliga game against SC Paderborn replacing Levent Ayçiçek after 83 minutes in a 4–0 home win. In February 2015 Eggestein signed his first professional contract, committing to the club till 2018. In the following 2015–2016 season, he made his full debut featuring in the number 10 role as Werder played Hertha Berlin on 22 August 2015.

In July 2017, Eggestein agreed a contract extension with the club. That season, his younger brother Johannes also gradually became established in the first team squad.

On 18 August 2018, Eggestein scored his first goal of the 2018–19 season, in a 6–1 win against Wormatia Worms in the first round of the DFB-Pokal. On 10 April 2019, Werder Bremen announced the extension of Eggestein's contract.

SC Freiburg
Eggestein moved to SC Freiburg in August 2021, following Werder Bremen's relegation from the Bundesliga and after ten years with the club.

International career
Eggestein is a youth international for Germany at the U20 level.

Career statistics

References

External links

Living people
1996 births
Footballers from Hanover
Association football midfielders
German footballers
Germany youth international footballers
Germany under-21 international footballers
Bundesliga players
2. Bundesliga players
3. Liga players
Regionalliga players
SV Werder Bremen players
SV Werder Bremen II players
SC Freiburg players